WHON 930 AM was a radio station broadcasting a classic hits format. Licensed to Centerville, Indiana, United States, the station served the Richmond area and was last owned by Brewer Broadcasting Corporation.

WHON was also heard locally in Richmond through an FM translator.

WHON's license was cancelled on August 11, 2021. Due to that, W269BP switched to simulcasting WQLK HD2.

References

External links
WHON's website
FCC Station Search Details: DWHON (Facility ID: 6746)
FCC History Cards for WHON (covering 1957-1980)

HON
Radio stations established in 1964
Radio stations disestablished in 2021
HON